Anthony Boone (born October 29, 1991) is a former American professional Canadian football quarterback. He played college football at Duke.

College career
Boone attended Duke University from 2010 to 2014. During his career he played in 46 games and made 25 starts. He finished with 5,789 passing yards and 38 touchdowns.

Professional career

Detroit Lions
After he was not selected in the 2015 NFL Draft, Boone signed with the Detroit Lions as an undrafted free agent. He was released by the Lions in June.

Montreal Alouettes
Boone signed with the Montreal Alouettes of the Canadian Football League in July 2015.

References

External links
Montreal Alouettes bio
Duke Blue Devils bio

1991 births
Living people
Players of American football from North Carolina
American football quarterbacks
Canadian football quarterbacks
African-American players of American football
African-American players of Canadian football
Duke Blue Devils football players
Detroit Lions players
Montreal Alouettes players
People from Weddington, North Carolina
21st-century African-American sportspeople